Eucalyptus caliginosa, commonly known as  broad-leaved stringybark or New England stringybark, is a tree that is endemic to eastern Australia. It has stringy bark, lance-shaped or curved adult leaves, flower buds in groups of seven or nine, white flowers and more or less hemispherical fruit. It is common on the Northern Tablelands and North West Slopes of New South Wales and adjacent areas of Queensland.

Description
The bark is rough, stringy, grey to reddish brown and extends to the smaller branches. Flowering occurs between March and October and the flowers are white.

Taxonomy
Eucalyptus caliginosa was first formally described by the botanists William Blakely and Ernest McKie in 1934 in Blakely's book A Key to the Eucalypts. The type specimen was collected near Guyra. The specific epithet (caliginosa) is a Latin word meaning "foggy", "misty" or "dark".

Distribution
The New England stringybark is commonly found on ridges and hilltops of south-eastern Queensland, the Northern Tablelands and North West Slopes of New South Wales. It grows in dry sclerophyll or open woodland or grassy forest communities and grows in loamy moderately fertile soils. It is found north of around Yarrowitch and the Liverpool Range extending to Stanthorpe in southern Queensland.

See also 

 Eucalyptus × tinghaensis, believed to be a hybrid of E. caliginosa and possibly E. mckieana.

References

caliginosa
Myrtales of Australia
Trees of Australia
Flora of New South Wales
Flora of Queensland
Trees of mild maritime climate
Drought-tolerant trees
Plants described in 1934
Taxa named by William Blakely
Taxobox binomials not recognized by IUCN